Penka Sokolova (16 April 1946 – 1977) was a Bulgarian hurdler. She competed in the women's 100 metres hurdles at the 1976 Summer Olympics.

References

External links
 

1946 births
1977 deaths
Athletes (track and field) at the 1976 Summer Olympics
Bulgarian female hurdlers
Bulgarian pentathletes
Olympic athletes of Bulgaria
Sportspeople from Varna, Bulgaria